Shongaloo is a village in Webster Parish, Louisiana, United States.

West of Shongaloo on Louisiana Highway 2 is Munn Hill, a homestead of Daniel and Rebecca Munn, established on July 26, 1900.

Shongaloo has a civic center for town council meetings as well as general usage. There is an adjacent museum with a restored log cabin.

Geography
Shongaloo is located at  (32.938129, -93.298369).

Dorcheat Bayou, 115-mile-long (185 km) runs through Shongaloo, making it one of the longest natural bayous in the U.S.

Transportation
Shongaloo is connected to other cities by road; currently, there is no air or boat access directly to the village. Air transportation is possible by using the Springhill Airport (15–20 minutes) or using the Shreveport Regional Airport (60–80 minutes). Shongaloo is connected to Sarepta and Homer via LA 2. Shongaloo is also connected to Magnolia and Minden via LA 159). LA 157 connects Shongaloo to Springhill and ALT LA 2 and LA 615 to Haynesville.

Interstate 69
Proposals have been made to build Interstate 69 south of the city around the community of Leton and east of the city near Haynesville. Currently, Shongaloo will have access to the freeway via interchanges at LA 159, LA 2, and LA 2 Alt.

Etymology and pronunciation
Shongaloo (pronounced Shawn-ga-lew) is an Indian term meaning "Running Water" or "Cypress Tree".

Demographics

As of the census of 2000, there were 162 people, 65 households, and 47 families residing in the village. The racial makeup of the village was 98.15% White, 0.62% Native American, and 1.23% from two or more races. Hispanic or Latino of any race were 0.62% of the population.

There were 65 households, out of which 27.7% had children under the age of 18 living with them, 66.2% were married couples living together, 4.6% had a female householder with no husband present, and 26.2% were non-families. 23.1% of all households were made up of individuals, and 12.3% had someone living alone who was 65 years of age or older. The average household size was 2.49 and the average family size was 2.83.

In the village, the population was spread out, with 21.6% under the age of 18, 5.6% from 18 to 24, 22.8% from 25 to 44, 28.4% from 45 to 64, and 21.6% who were 65 years of age or older. The median age was 45 years. For every 100 females, there were 105.1 males. For every 100 females age 18 and over, there were 104.8 males.

The median income for a household in the village was $41,250, and the median income for a family was $48,750. Males had a median income of $32,500 versus $22,500 for females. The per capita income for the village was $20,809. About 5.0% of families and 10.5% of the population were below the poverty line, including 9.5% of those under the age of eighteen and 18.8% of those sixty-five or over.

Local channels

Shongaloo is located in the Shreveport/Texarkana broadcasting market (#82 DMA Market).

Education

North Webster Lower Elementary School, formerly Shongaloo High School before 2011, serves Shongaloo, Sarepta, and Cotton Valley for Pre-K-2nd graders. The school was formed during consolidation which moved Shongaloo 3rd-12th grade students to various schools within Webster Parish. In 1979, the Shongaloo Tiger baseball team won the Louisiana LHSAA Class C State Championship.

Notable people
 Parey Pershing Branton, Sr., former member of the Louisiana House of Representatives, the Webster Parish School Board, and mayor of Shongaloo; father of Daniel Branton
 Henry Burns, state representative for District 9 in Bossier Parish; Shongaloo native born in 1947, candidate in 2015 for the Louisiana State Senate
 E.D. Gleason (1899–1959), member of the Louisiana House of Representatives from 1952 until his death in office
 Mary Smith Gleason (1899–1967) of the nearby Evergreen Community, succeeded her husband as a member of the Louisiana House from 1959 to 1960.
 Talmadge L. Heflin, born in Shongaloo, is a Republican former member of the Texas House of Representatives.
 W. W. Hicks (1843-1925), member of the Louisiana House of Representatives from 1900 to 1904 and the Webster Parish Police Jury from 1904 to 1908; South Carolina native living in Shongaloo.
Carlus D. Morgan (1917–2007), educator and member of the Webster Parish Police Jury from 1988 to 1992, resided in the Evergreen community.

References

Villages in Louisiana
Villages in Webster Parish, Louisiana